Ole Jacob Hansen (16 April 1940 in Oslo, Norway – 6 March 2000) was a Norwegian jazz musician (drums), known from a number recordings and international cooperation.

Career 
Hansen established himself on the Oslo jazz scene first in Tore Sandnæs Big Band (1958), Mikkel Flagstad Quintet (1959), Bjørn Jacobsen Septet (1958–60), Arild Wikstrøm Quartet (1961) and within Kjell Karlsen's various ensembles including at Moldejazz (1962), Bjørn Johansen Quartet (1962). He was subsequently within Bernt Rosengren Orchestra in Stockholm (1963–64), with Idrees Sulieman (1964), and in Paris with Eric Dolphy and Donald Byrd.

At the Metropol Jazz Club he played with a number of the world's leading jazz musicians. During the 1970s, he contributed to several recordings with Ditlef Eckhoff, Paul Weeden and Terje Bjørklund, as well as within Adonis (74–75) with several gigs at Club 7. He established the club Jazz Alive (1980) in Oslo, and in the 1980s and 1990s he played with Thorgeir Stubø, Lee Konitz, Doug Raney, Laila Dalseth, Jan Erik Vold, Harald Gundhus, Knut Riisnæs, Totti Bergh, and Einar Iversen.

Hansen was a colorful and highly engaged drummer, and a central figure in Norwegian jazz from 1960 until his death.

Honors 
Reenskaugprisen 1982
Buddyprisen 1997
Gammleng-prisen 1996 in the class Jazz

Discography 
1974: Attakullaculla (RCA International), with Paul Weeden
1976: La Dette Bli Min Sang (EMI Norge), with Stein Ove Berg
1978: Club 7's Jubileumsplater (Plateselskapet Mai), with various artists
1982: I'll Close My Eyes with Doug Raney
1983: Meeting the Tenors with Doug Raney
1983: The Improviser with Chet Baker
1984: Daydreams (Hot Club Records), with Laila Dalseth Quintet feat. Louis Stewart
1984: Everything We Love (Hot Club Records), with Doug Raney & Thorgeir Stubø
1984: Lazy Bird with Doug Raney
1988: The End of a Tune (Cadence Jazz Records), with Thorgeir Stubø
1988: Mood Indigo (Gemini Records), with Bjarne Nerem, Kenny Davern & Flip Phillips
1991: Constellations (Odin Records), with Bjørn Alterhaug
1997: Impressions of Antibes (Gemini Records), with Ditlef Eckhoff
2003: Friends (Gemini Records), within Kapstad-Johansen Quartet
2004: Live at Molde Jazzfestival 1976 (Jazzaway Records, NRK), with Carl Magnus Neumann & Christian Reim Quartet
2004: Jargong Vålereng''' (Ponca Jazz Records), with Rolf Søder & Egil Kapstad Og Hans Musikanter
2005: Til Jorden (Pan Records), with Rolf Jacobsen & Egil Kapstad
2007: NRK Sessions: Soul, Afro-Jazz And Latin From The Club 7 Scene (Plastic Strip, NRK), with various artists
2008: Live at Kongsberg And Other Unreleased Works (Plastic Strip), with Carl Magnus Neumann
2008: Unreleased Works 1969–1979'' (Plastic Strip), with Christian Reim

References

External links 
Ole Jacob Hansen Biography on Norsk Musikkinformasjon

1940 births
2000 deaths
Musicians from Oslo
20th-century Norwegian drummers
21st-century Norwegian drummers
Norwegian jazz drummers
Male drummers
20th-century drummers
20th-century Norwegian male musicians
21st-century Norwegian male musicians
Male jazz musicians